Howarthia is a genus of butterflies in the family Lycaenidae ranging from China to Laos and Myanmar.  It is named after British entomologist Graham Howarth.

Species
Howarthia caelestis (Leech, 1890) ) includes H. c. elegans Sugiyama, 1997 and H. c. derani Koiwaya, 2000  West China, Myanmar
Howarthia cheni Chou & Wang, 1997 China, Guangdong, Ruyuan County.
Howarthia courvoisieri (Oberthür, 1908) West China
Howarthia hishikawai Koiwaya, 2000 China, Guizhou, Kaili, 1700 m.
Howarthia kimurai Koiwaya, 2002 China, W Sichuan, Emei-shan
Howarthia melli (Forster, 1940) China (Kwangtung)
Howarthia nigricans (Leech, 1893)  China, Ta-Chien-Lou.
Howarthia sakakibarai Koiwaya, 2002 China, W Sichuan, Baoxing, 1500-2000 m.
Howarthia sugiyamai Koiwaya, 2002= Hayashikeia sugiyamai China, Hunan, Wuling Shan.
Howarthia ueharai Koiwaya, 2002 Laos
Howarthia wakaharai Koiwaya, 2000 China, Sichuan Nanchuan, 2,000m.
Howarthia watanabei Koiwaya, 1993 Hainan
Howarthia yukinobui Koiwaya, 2002 Myanmar

References

Theclini
Lycaenidae genera